The enzyme [pyruvate dehydrogenase (acetyl-transferring)]-phosphatase (EC 3.1.3.43) catalyzes the reaction 

[pyruvate dehydrogenase (acetyl-transferring)] phosphate + HO  [pyruvate dehydrogenase (acetyl-transferring)] + phosphate

This enzyme belongs to the family of hydrolases, specifically those acting on phosphoric monoester bonds.  The systematic name is [pyruvate dehydrogenase (acetyl-transferring)]-phosphate phosphohydrolase. Other names in common use include pyruvate dehydrogenase phosphatase, phosphopyruvate dehydrogenase phosphatase, [pyruvate dehydrogenase (lipoamide)]-phosphatase, and [pyruvate dehydrogenase (lipoamide)]-phosphate phosphohydrolase.

Structural studies

As of late 2007, only one structure has been solved for this class of enzymes, with the PDB accession code .

References

 
 

EC 3.1.3
Enzymes of known structure